Velké Bílovice is a town in Břeclav District in the South Moravian Region of the Czech Republic. It has about 3,800 inhabitants. It is known for viticulture.

Geography

There are two fish ponds, Velký Bílovec and Šísary.

History
The first written record of Velké Bílovice comes from 1306 but the area was settled much earlier. Houses of Liechtenstein and Zierotin were the most important owners in the history of Velké Bílovice. In the 16th century, group of Hutterites settled in the area, cultivated grapevine and built many large wine cellars.

At the beginning of the 20th century, many citizens of Velké Bílovice migrated to Argentina, Canada and the United States.

Velké Bílovice was promoted to a town in 2001. However, due to agriculture and wine growing, it still retains its village character.

Demographics

Economy
Velké Bílovice is known for viticulture and winemaking. This area makes it the largest grapevine-growing town in the country.

Transport
Southwest of the town runs the D2 motorway with exit Velké Bílovice and Podivín.

The nearest railway station is located 3 km away in Podivín.

Culture

Hody ("The Feasts") is the most important folk festival in Velké Bílovice. It begins on the first Sunday after the Day of the Virgin Mary's Birth (8 September), patron saint of the local church, and continues till Tuesday. On the Saturday before the Feasts festive maypole is manually erected. The main celebration takes place on Sunday, when many visitors even from far away come to admire the folk costume parade, which is annually attended by more than 50 costumed couples.

"From wine cellar to wine cellar" is a traditional cultural event, consisting of walking around wine cellars and tasting plenty of different varieties of wines from many different winemakers. It is regularly held on Saturday at the turn of March and April.

"Wine exhibition" is a traditional social event since 1965. In the town's Culture House, 600 to 900 wine samples of local winemakers and winemakers from the surrounding villages, especially from the Velkopavlovická wine-growing sub-region, are exhibited. It is held at the turn of April and May.

Sights

Hutterite wine cellars are well known wine cellars. The biggest one was built around 1614. Its current owner is the company Habánské sklepy.

Town Museum is a museum with local folk costumes, many archaeological finds from the area, old farm tools and other things associated with the history of the town.

Hradištěk-Zímarky Hill is a distinctive landscape element with an excellent outlook. On the hilltop there is a chapel which is consecrated to four saints: St. Urban (patron saint of winemakers), St. Wenceslaus (patron saint of the Czech Lands) and Saints Cyril and Methodius (patrons saints of Christianity in the Czech Lands).

Church of the Nativity of the Virgin Mary was built in late Baroque style in 1764–1765.

Twin towns – sister cities

Velké Bílovice is twinned with:
 Presidencia Roque Sáenz Peña, Argentina
 Šenkvice, Slovakia

Gallery

References

External links

 
Winemakers Guild of Velké Bílovice 
Town Museum of Velké Bílovice 

Cities and towns in the Czech Republic
Populated places in Břeclav District